Pervomaysky is a rural locality (a settlement) in Aleysky Selsoviet, Aleysky District, Altai Krai, Russia. The population was 160 as of 2013. There are 4 streets.

Geography 
Pervomaysky is located 13 km west of Aleysk (the district's administrative centre) by road. Zavety Ilyicha is the nearest rural locality.

References 

Rural localities in Aleysky District